Ben Edward Jarvis (June 22, 1925 – September 19, 2018) was an American politician. He served as a Democratic member in the Texas House of Representatives from 1959 to 1965. He died in September 2018 at the age of 93.

References

1925 births
2018 deaths
Members of the Texas House of Representatives